Huilong is a town of Zhen'an County in southern Shaanxi province, China, situated in a valley of the Qin Mountains along G65 Baotou–Maoming Expressway about  north of the county seat as the crow flies. , it has nine villages under its administration.

References

Township-level divisions of Shaanxi